Ruslan Nailevich Nurtdinov (born March 30, 1980) is a Russian former professional ice hockey winger.

Nurtdinov played for Salavat Yulaev Ufa, SKA Saint Petersburg, Severstal Cherepovets, Ak Bars Kazan, Metallurg Magnitogorsk, Amur Khabarovsk, Neftekhimik Nizhnekamsk and Metallurg Novokuznetsk.

References

External links
 

Living people
1980 births
Ak Bars Kazan players
Amur Khabarovsk players
HC Kuban players
Metallurg Magnitogorsk players
Metallurg Novokuznetsk players
HC Neftekhimik Nizhnekamsk players
Russian ice hockey left wingers
Salavat Yulaev Ufa players
Severstal Cherepovets players
SKA Saint Petersburg players
Sportspeople from Ufa
Sputnik Nizhny Tagil players